The Ministry of the Interior and Safety (MOIS) is a branch of the Government of South Korea. The headquarters are in Sejong City. It is responsible for national administration, management of government organizations, and e-government. Furthermore, it supports local governments in terms of local administration, finance, and regional development to promote greater local autonomy.

Institutions
It has its headquarters and several offices in Sejong City. It also has offices in Jongno-gu, Seoul. Previously the headquarters were in Seoul.

Institutions:
 Local Government Officials Development Institute (LOGODI)
 National Archives of Korea
 National Forensic Service
 National Computing and Information Service
  National Fire Agency
  National Police Agency
 Committee for the Five Northern Korean Provinces

See also 
 Republic Of Korea Civil Defense Corps
 Ministry of Security and Public Administration

References

External links

Official website 
Official website 
 Local Government Officials Development Institute (LOGODI)

Government ministries of South Korea
Internal affairs ministries
Public safety ministries